Chloé is a French luxury fashion house founded in 1952 by Gaby Aghion. During the next year of 1953 Aghion joined forces with Jacques Lenoir, formally managing the business side of the brand, allowing Aghion to purely pursue the creative growth of Chloé. Its headquarters are located in Paris, France. The house is owned by luxury brands holding company Richemont Group. Chloé has been worn by many celebrities, including Marion Cotillard, Sienna Miller, Madonna, January Jones, Maggie Gyllenhaal, Cameron Diaz, Emma Stone, Clémence Poésy and Katie Holmes. The brand is characterized by a youthful and bohemian aesthetic, and has produced several successful fragrances.

History
Gaby Aghion (1921-2014) was born in Alexandria, Egypt. After moving to Paris, France in 1945, she founded Chloé in 1952 with a vision of offering luxury prêt-à-porter (Ready-To-Wear), a new concept at that time. Gaby Aghion and her partner Jacques Lenoir continued to run the house until 1985, when Chloé was bought by Alfred Dunhill Ltd. (now part of Richemont).

Locations 
Chloé's headquarters are located at Avenue Percier, 8th arrondissement of Paris. The regional offices are in New York, Tokyo, Shanghai, Hong Kong and Dubai.

Chloé has boutiques in Toronto, Bal Harbour, Costa Mesa, Las Vegas, New York City, Beijing (2), Sydney, Shanghai (2), Shenzhen, Hong Kong (2), Singapore, Kaohsiung, Taipei (3), Bangkok, Bandung, Paris, Munich, Porto Cervo, Moscow (2), Marbella, Istanbul, London, Tokyo (2), Nagoya, Salmiya, Beirut, Doha, Seoul, Zurich, Dubai (2) and Kuwait.

Timeline 
 1952: Chloé is founded by Gaby Aghion, a Parisian of Egyptian-Jewish origin. She and her partner, Jacques Lenoir, were among the first to become aware of the rising demand for collections that could merge the strict requirements of haute couture and those of ready-to-wear.
 1956: The first collection is introduced at Le Café de Flore, one of their favorite cafes and the meeting place of artists in Paris. The collection was designed by Gaby Aghion and made by a first assistant at Lelong. Gaby Aghion and Jacques Lenoir start hiring young talented designers, who would eventually make a name of their own: Christiana Bailly, Michèle Rosier, Maxime de la Falaise, Graziella Fontana, Tan Giudicelli, Guy Paulin, Carlos Rodriguez.
 1966: Karl Lagerfeld is the main designer and Chloé becomes one of the symbolic brands of the 1970s. Among its customers : Jackie Kennedy, Brigitte Bardot, Maria Callas and Grace Kelly.
 1971: The first Chloé boutique opens at the 3 rue Gribeauval in Paris.
 1985: The company is acquired by the Richemont group.
 1980s: Chloé keeps working with promising and eventually famous artistic directors: Martine Sitbon in 1988, Karl Lagerfeld in 1992.
 1997: Stella McCartney brings in a new direction, feminine, romantic and impertinent.
 2001: Phoebe Philo adds a personal and sensual touch. Kirsten Dunst, Natalie Portman, and Lou Doillon become customers.
 2002: Chloé launches a line of bags, small leather goods and shoes. The Paddington bag will become the first of the 'it-bags'.
 2006: Paulo Melim Andersson brings in a staggered and modern style.
 2008: After close collaboration with the brand for the launch of the fragrance, Hannah MacGibbon is named artistic director.
 2009: MacGibbon introduces her first collection in March at the Spring-Summer 2009 runway. She cited the fashion illustrations of Antonio Lopez as an inspiration. American actress, former model and fashion designer Chloë Sevigny becomes a spokesperson for the company.
 2010: Geoffroy de la Bourdonnaye becomes CEO and chairman Ralph Toledano
 2011: MacGibbon is replaced by former Pringle of Scotland Designer Clare Waight Keller.
 2012: Chloé starts sponsorship of the annual Prix Chloé at the Festival de Mode de Hyères
 2017: Clare Waight Keller is replaced by Natacha Ramsay-Levi as creative director of Chloé
 2020: Natacha Ramsay-Levi announces she will leave Chloé in December 2020, with Gabriela Hearst announced as her replacement with her debut collection out in March 2021.

References

External links

 Chloé's official site

Richemont brands
High fashion brands
French brands
Companies based in Paris
Comité Colbert members
Eyewear brands of France
Catégorie:Membre du Comité Colbert